Kerry Hemsley (born 10 May 1960) is an Australian former professional rugby league footballer who played in the 1970s and 1980s. He played for the 

While playing for Yanco, Hemsley was selected to play for Riverina against the touring Great Britain side in 1979.

Hemsley was recommended to Balmain by his Yanco captain-coach and former Tiger, Keith Outten. Hemsley spent nine seasons at Balmain, earning himself a reputation as an enforcer on the field and he became a club and crowd favourite with his long hair and beard.

During the Australian off-seasons, Hemsley played in France for Le Pontet XIII in 1982–1983 and in England for Wigan in 1983–84. He became the first Balmain player to appear at Wembley Stadium in a cup final when Wigan met and were defeated by Widnes Vikings.

1988 was to be Hemsley's last season with Balmain. Having made the semi-finals in the previous 2 seasons, Hemsley was out of the team from round 3, with coach Warren Ryan preferring other players. He returned only for the semis, after the suspension of Steve Roach. He started at prop for the 24–12 loss to Canterbury in the grand final. Following his retirement he played a further 8 years of bush football with Yanco and Blayney.

References

Sources
 
 

1960 births
Living people
Australian rugby league coaches
Australian rugby league players
Balmain Tigers players
Rugby league players from Junee
Rugby league props
Wigan Warriors players